The South Korean national ice hockey team is the national men's ice hockey team of the Republic of Korea (South Korea). They are currently ranked 19th in the IIHF World Rankings and competed in the World Championship top division tournament. The team's most successful campaign thus far was a second-place finish in the 2017 Division I Group A tournament and thus qualifying for the top division in 2018. They competed in their first Winter Olympics in 2018 in Pyeongchang as the host nation.

History

South Korea first participated in the World Championship in 1979, playing in Pool C, the third level of the tournament. They did not return until 1982, again in Pool C, and became a regular participant in 1986. They remained at the Division I level, the second tier of the World Championship, from 2010 until 2017, when they earned a promotion to the 2018 World Championship.

Upon being named the host country for the 2018 Winter Olympics in Pyeongchang, the South Korean team began efforts to steadily improve themselves in order to be competitive with the other teams expected at the tournament, led by the efforts of Korea Ice Hockey Association president Chung Mong-won.

Several North American players playing for teams in South Korea were offered South Korean citizenship, thus allowing them to play at the Olympics. This was done to help the team perform better in the lead-up to the Olympics, which proved successful: when awarded the Olympics in 2011, the South Korean team was ranked 31st in the IIHF World Ranking, while on the eve of the Olympics had moved up to 18th.

Tournament record

Olympic Games
2018 – 12th place

World Championship

1979 – 25th place (7th in Pool C)
1982 – 24th place (8th in Pool C)
1986 – 25th place (9th in Pool C)
1987 – 26th place (2nd in Pool D)
1989 – 23rd place (7th in Pool C)
1990 – 25th place (9th in Pool C)
1991 – 24th place (8th in Pool C)
1992 – 26th place (6th in Pool C, Group A)
1993 – 25th place (9th in Pool C)
1994 – 30th place (10th in Pool C)
1995 – 33rd place (13th in Pool C)
1996 – 33rd place (5th in Pool D)
1997 – 30th place (2nd in Pool D)
1998 – 31st place (7th in Pool C)
1999 – 30th place (6th in Pool C)
2000 – 29th place (5th in Pool C)
2001 – 30th place (1st in Division II, Group A) Promoted to Division I
2002 – 27th place (6th in Division I, Group A) Relegated to Division II
2003 – 29th place (1st in Division II, Group A) Promoted to Division I

2004 – 27th place (6th in Division I, Group B) Relegated to Division II
2005 – 33rd place (3rd in Division II, Group A)
2006 – 31st place (2nd in Division II, Group B)
2007 – 30th place (1st in Division II, Group B) Promoted to Division I
2008 – 28th place (6th in Division I, Group A) Relegated to Division II
2009 – 29th place (1st in Division II, Group B) Promoted to Division I
2010 – 25th place (5th in Division I, Group B)
2011 – 22nd place (3rd in Division I, Group A)
2012 – 23rd place (1st in Division I, Group B) Promoted to Division I A
2013 – 21st place (5th in Division I, Group A)
2014 – 22nd place (6th in Division I, Group A) Relegated to Division I B
2015 – 23rd place (1st in Division I, Group B) Promoted to Division I A
2016 – 21st place (5th in Division I, Group A)
2017 – 18th place (2nd in Division I, Group A) Promoted to Top Division
2018 – 16th place (8th in Group B) Relegated to Division I A
2019 – 19th place (3rd in Division I, Group A)
2020 – Cancelled due to the COVID-19 pandemic
2021 – Cancelled due to the COVID-19 pandemic
2022 – 20th place (4th in Division I, Group A)

Asian Winter Games
1986 –  3rd place
1990 –  3rd place
1996 – 4th place
1999 – 4th place
2003 – 4th place
2007 –  3rd place
2011 –  3rd place
2017 –  2nd place

All-time record against other nations
Last match update: 16 February 2018

All-time record against other clubs
Last match update: 11 August 2017

See also
South Korea men's national junior ice hockey team
South Korea men's national under-18 ice hockey team
South Korea women's national ice hockey team

References

External links

IIHF profile
National Teams of Ice Hockey profile

 
Korea, South
Ice hockey teams in South Korea